The 52nd International Film Festival of India opened on 20 November 2021 with The King of All the World (El Rey de Todo El Mundo) by Carlos Saura in Goa. Like 51st edition this edition was also held in hybrid format, that combined online and face-to-face participation. BRICS Film Festival is being held alongside main festival, in which films from BRICS nations, namely Brazil, Russia, South Africa, China and India are showcased. These five countries are 'country of focus' in the 52nd edition of the festival.

In 2021 festival, on the occasion of the birth centenary of Satyajit Ray, the Directorate of Film Festivals is paying tribute to him through a 'Special Retrospective' in which his 11 specially curated films are screened. Lifetime Achievement award, in recognition of the auteur’s legacy, has been named as ‘Satyajit Ray Lifetime Achievement Award’ from this year. In this edition for the first time, streaming video platforms Netflix, Amazon Prime, Zee5, Voot and Sony Liv are participating in  series of physical and virtual events.

The opening ceremony on 20 November 2021, hosted by Karan Johar and Manish Paul was aired live. It was also streamed live on YouTube. The festival closed on 28 November with Asghar Farhadi's film A Hero and the closing ceremony was streamed live on YouTube.

Events
Being a ‘hybrid’ film festival, a few events are organised online also.

Master classes
 Netflix organisined a 3-day virtual masterclass by the school of image and arts, Gobelins, l'École de l'image based in Paris.
 Screenwriters Sumit Purohit and Saurav Dey held master classes  organised by SonyLiv. 
 Nitesh Tiwari and Ashwiny Iyer Tiwari curated Breakpoint, a series on tennis stars Leander Paes and Mahesh Bhupathi was organised by ZEE5.

 75 creative minds in the age group of 35 years and below were invited to interact with industry stalwarts and attend masterclasses.

Tribute
The festival paid tribute to:
 Dilip Kumar, Indian actor and film producer  
 Sumitra Bhave, Indian filmmaker
 Buddhadeb Dasgupta, Indian poet and filmmaker
 Sanchari Vijay, Indian actor
 Surekha Sikri, Indian theatre, film and television actress
 Jean-Paul Belmondo, French actor
 Bertrand Tavernier, French director, screenwriter, actor and producer
 Christopher Plummer, Canadian actor
 Jean-Claude Carrière, French novelist, screenwriter and actor
 Sean Connery, Scottish actor
 Puneeth Rajkumar, Indian actor, singer, and dancer

Retrospective films section
The retrospective section featured Hungarian filmmaker Béla Tarr, Russian filmmaker and stage director Andrei Konchalovsky and Dadasaheb Phalke Award winner Rajinikanth.

Creative minds of the future
75 creative minds selected in first round by a selection jury and in final round by a grand jury attended the 52nd International Film Festival. These '75 Creative Minds of Tomorrow' in the age group of 35 years and below interacted with industry stalwarts and attended the masterclasses. 

Grand jury
 Prasoon Joshi - lyricist and chairman, Central Board of Film Certification (CBFC)
 Ketan Mehta - director
 Shankar Mahadevan -  composer and singer
 Manoj Bajpayee - actor
 Resul Pookutty - Oscar winning sound recordist
 Vipul Amrutlal Shah - filmmaker
Selection Jury
 Vani Tripathi - producer and actor, member CBFC
 Anant Vijay - writer 
 Yatindra Mishra - author and writer
 Sanjay Puran Singh Chauhan - filmmaker
 Sachin Khedekar – actor, director

Jury

International jury
 Rakhshān Banietemad (Iran), filmmaker, Chairperson
 Stephen Woolley (UK), film producer and director
 Ciro Guerra (Columbia), film director and screenwriter
 Vimukthi Jayasundara (Sri Lanka), filmmaker, critic and a visual artist
 Nila Madhab Panda (India), producer and director

Feature film jury
SV Rajendra Singh Babu (India), filmmaker and  actor, works in Kannada cinema, Chairperson
 Rajendra Hegde, audiographer
 Makhonmani Mongsaba, filmmaker
 Vinod Anupama, film critic
 Jayashree Bhattcharya, filmmaker
 Gyan Sahay, cinematographer
 Prasantanu Mohapatra, cinematographer
 Hemendra Bhatia, actor, writer and filmmaker
 Asim Bose, cinematographer
 Pramod Pawar, actor and filmmaker
 Manjunath T S, cinematographer
 Malay Ray, filmmaker
 Parag Chhapekar, filmmaker, journalist

Non-feature film jury
 S. Nallamuthu (India), leading wildlife and documentary filmmaker, Chairperson
 Akashaditya Lama, filmmaker
 Sibanu Borah, documentary filmmaker
 Suresh Sharma, film producer
 Subrat Jyoti Neog, film critic
 Manisha Kulshreshtha, writer
 Atul Gangwar, writer

Preview Committee

 Suresh Bhardwaj, Ex Prof & Dean NSD
 Malti Sahay, Ex Director IFFI
 Manjula Shirodkar, Journalist & Film Critic
 Satinder Mohan, ADG (Rtd) MOD, Film Critic 
 Rajesh S. Jala, Film Maker
 Joydeep Ghosh, Film Maker & Journalist
 Shyam Malick, Film Maker & Journalist
 Vishnu Sharma, Author, Film Critic, Journalist

Official selection

Sections
 Kaleidoscope section
 Golden Peacock Award
 Films for debut competition
ICFT UNESCO Gandhi Medal
 Indian Panorama
 Feature films
 Non-feature films
 World Panorama
 Soul of Asia
 Country of focus
 Masters of cinema
 Jury package
 Special Tribute/Homage
 Retrospective film
 Sports package
 Special screening
 India @75

Opening and closing films

Kaleidoscope section 
11 films are shortlisted for screening under Kaleidoscope section.

Golden Peacock Award
  
Highlighted title indicates award winner

Films for debut competition
  
Highlighted title indicates award winner

IFFI ICFT UNESCO Gandhi Medal

Highlighted title indicates award winner

Indian Panorama 
In Indian Panorama feature and non-feature films of cinematic, thematic, and aesthetic excellence are selected for the promotion of film art through the non-profit screening of these films under different categories.

Feature films 
India's entry for the 2022 Academy Awards, Tamil film Koozhangal, will be screened in the Indian Panorama feature film segment. 24 Feature films reflecting the vibrancy and diversity of the Indian film Industry have been selected out of 221 contemporary films for screening.

Non-feature Films

World Panorama 
55 films are invited for screening under World Panorama section.

Soul of Asia 
6 films are slated for screening under this section.

Country of focus
6th edition of BRICS Film Festival is being held alongside main festival, in which films from BRICS nations, namely Brazil, Russia, South Africa, China and India are showcased. These five countries are 'country of focus'.

Masters of cinema

Jury package

Special Tribute

Retrospective films

Sports package

Special screening

India @75

Awards and winners

 Golden Peacock (Best Film): The award carries a cash prize of  shared equally between the director and producer. The director will receive the 'Golden Peacock' and a certificate in addition to the cash prize. The Producer will receive a certificate in addition to the cash.
 Silver Peacock: 
Best Director: Silver Peacock, certificate and a cash prize of 
Special Jury Award: Silver Peacock, certificate and a cash prize of  given to a film or an individual. The award will be given to the director of the film in case a film wins the award.
Special Mention:
ICFT UNESCO Gandhi Medal
Stayajit Ray Lifetime Achievement Award 
Indian Film Personality of the Year Award

Winners

Winners BRICS Film Festival

See also
 List of film festivals in India
 50th International Film Festival of India

References

External links
 

2021 film festivals
2021 festivals in Asia
52
2021 in Indian cinema